The Valur men's basketball team, commonly known as Valur, is a basketball team based in Reykjavík, Iceland. It is part of the Valur multi-sport club.

History
The club was founded as Gosi on 25 December 1951 and was one of the founding members of the Icelandic men's top division. On 22 December 1957 the club changed its name to Körfuknattleiksfélag Reykjavíkur (English: Reykjavík Basketball Club) and played under that name until 1970. On 3 October 1970 the club merged into Valur sports club and became its basketball department.

Under the new name, Valur had considerable success in the 1980's, winning the Icelandic championship two times, in 1980 and 1983, and the Icelandic cup three times, 1980, 1981 and 1983.

In 1992, Valur reached the Úrvalsdeild finals where it lost to Keflavík 2-3.

In 2022, Valur won its third national championship after beating Tindastóll in the Úrvalsdeild finals. On 2 October 2022, Valur won its first Super Cup, after defeating Icelandic Cup holders Stjarnan 80-77.

On 14 January 2023, Valur won its fourth Icelandic Cup title, and its first in 40 years, after defeating Stjarnan in the Cup final.

Honours
Úrvalsdeild karla
 Winners (3): 1980, 1983, 2022

Icelandic Cup
 Winners (3): 1980, 1981, 1983, 2023

Icelandic Super Cup
 Winners: 2022

Division I
 Winners (2): 1997, 2002

Individual awards

Úrvalsdeild Men's Domestic Player of the Year 
Kristófer Acox – 2022
Magnús Matthíasson – 1991
Rick Hockenos – 1978
Torfi Magnússon – 1982
Þórir Magnússon – 1974
Úrvalsdeild Men's Foreign Player of the Year
Tim Dwyer – 1979, 1980, 1983
Úrvalsdeild Men's Domestic All-First Team 
Kristófer Acox – 2021, 2022
Magnús Matthíasson – 1991, 1993
Tómas Holton – 1989
Úrvalsdeild Men's Young Player of the Year 
Magnús Matthíasson – 1991
1. deild karla Player of the Year
Ragnar Jónsson – 1997
1. deild karla Coach of the Year
Torfi Magnússon – 1997
Icelandic Cup Finals MVP
Kári Jónsson – 2023

Notable players

Coaches
 Ólafur Þór Thorlacius 1970–1974
 Guðmundur Þorsteinsson 1974–1976
 Tim Dwyer 1978–1980, 1982–1983
 Vladimir Obuchov 1990–1991
 Tómas Holton 1991–1992
 Svali Björgvinsson 1992–1993, 1994, 1997–1999
 Ágúst Björgvinsson 2011–2019
 Finnur Freyr Stefánsson 2020–present

European record

References

Valur (basketball)